Thomas A. Edison Career and Technical Education High School (often referred to locally simply as Edison) is a public secondary school in Queens's Jamaica Hills community in New York City. It is one of the few public high schools in New York City to offer vocational training programs as well as traditional college preparatory tracks and well known for its largely male population. The school is operated by the New York City Department of Education.

Location
The campus is located near the top of a fairly steep hill at the corner of 168th Street and 84th Avenue, and sits on the south side the Grand Central Parkway; St. John's University is situated diagonally across the parkway to the northeast. Hillside Avenue, at the foot of the hill, is several blocks to the south.

Jamaica High School is separated from Edison by 84th Avenue and the Jamaica High School Track and Football Field. These schools do not share any affiliation with each other. Hillcrest High School, another nearby high school, is located at Highland Avenue and Parsons Blvd.

Academic programs
Students at Edison generally take required courses in health, music theory, and art appreciation during their freshman year, at the end of which they choose a track to pursue in grades 10–12. Edison offers college-preparatory technological programs such as mechanical and electronic technologies as well as more trade-oriented programs such as medical assisting, automotive and computer repair (A+ Certification), mechanical engineering / AUTOCAD, C++ programming, computer graphics design, and the Cisco Networking Academy, in which one can earn a CCNA network certification upon completion of the program. In information technology, students take Electronics and Cabling for one term. After they pass both classes, they have a choice of major (i.e., A+ Repair, Cisco, MOS) for junior and senior year.

Career and technical education courses

 Collision Repair and Refinishing
 Registered nursing
 Medical Assisting
 Technical Electronics Engineering/ Robotics
 CAD / Mechanical Engineering
 Cisco Networking
 Computer Repair (A+ Certification Specialists)
 Commercial Art
 Automotive Technologies
 Electrical Installation Technologies
 Web Design
 Construction Trades and Management
 Graphic Art Communications
 Law
 Academy of Engineering
 Biology (Sex Education)
 U.S Government and Public Law
 National Law
 International Law.

Demographics

During the 2018–2019 school year, the school had an enrollment of 2,196 students. Of Edison's students, 48% are Asian, 23% are Hispanic or Latino, 18% are black, 4% are white, and 5% are Native American. Of Edison's students, 65% are male, and 35% are female.

In the fall of 2006, Edison admitted 873 freshmen (9th graders). The total student population is approximately 250 larger than the 2005–2006 school year. The increase in student population has required the hiring of more than 20 new teachers. Crowding is an issue in a building designed for 1,600 students.

When Edison first opened in 1950 as an all-boys school, there were 700 students. Girls were first admitted in the late 1970s.

Student activities
Edison participates in a wide variety of citywide sporting activities as the Edison Inventors in the Public School Athletic League.

Notable alumni
 Allen Coage – Olympic bronze medal-winning judoka and professional wrestler
 Stephen A. Smith – ESPN sports personality and Philadelphia Inquirer sports columnist is a member of the graduating class of 1986.
 Ruben Wills – former member of the New York City Council, serving the 28th district from 2011 until he was convicted of a felony in August 2017.
 Mike Windischmann – professional soccer player

References

External links

 
 NYC Dept. of Education page on Edison
 Google Maps Hybrid Image
 Public Schools Athletic League Thomas Edison pages link on the PSAL Public Schools Athletic League Web Site.
 WABC-TV News High school sections by elementary school students

Public high schools in Queens, New York
Vocational schools in the United States
Jamaica, Queens